The Leslie Bell Prize for Choral Conducting is a $10 000 prize awarded by the Ontario Arts Council every two years to support a selected choral conductor in furthering his/her professional career and enhancing his/her choral conducting abilities.

The award recognizes excellence in emerging conductors. Candidates are considered based on artistic merit as demonstrated by his or her abilities, cumulative body of work, and contribution to the art form.

History 
In 1971, the Leslie Bell Singers Alumnae and friends of the late Leslie Richard Bell established the Leslie Bell Scholarship Fund as a tribute to the conductor. Bell was a choir conductor, educator, writer, arranger and composer.

Selection process 
Choirs Ontario manages the selection process. Candidates submit a package composed of a curriculum vitae, letters of reference and audio-visual support material by mail to Choirs Ontario by the specified deadline.

Choirs Ontario assembles a selection panel of choral musicians to evaluate the submissions. Panelists must have the following qualifications; a broad spectrum of knowledge and experience in choral music, ability to provide fair and objective opinions, ability to articulate their opinions and to work in a group decision-making environment.

Prior to the selection meeting each panellist becomes familiar with the award and its assessment criteria. Additionally the panellist reviews each package submitted by the candidates and make reference notes in context to the award’s assessment criteria. Individuals selected to be on the panel are not to disclose their role. For transparency, the names of panellists is released with results following each competition. Upon discovering a conflict with any of the candidates, a panellist will remove themselves from the selection process.

At the selection meeting, all of the panellists review each of the candidate's submissions to come to a group decision and recommend the winner. The panel is required to keep the discussions during the panel meeting and contents of all submissions confidential.

Eligibility 
To be a candidate for this award, an individual must meet the following criteria;
 Professional conductor (past training and actively work in a professional capacity) 
 Canadian citizen or permanent resident of Canada 
 Resident in Ontario
 Recognized locally and regionally by his or her peers (those within the same artistic tradition and/or discipline) and recognized for his or her contribution to the field of music
 Within the first ten years of his/her professional career

Past recipients
1973 Edward Moroney 
1974 Robert Cooper 
1975 David Christiani 
1976 Carol E. Boyle 
1977 Jean Ashworth Bartle
1978 Dr. Gerald Neufeld 
1981 Brainerd Blyden-Taylor 
1983 Richard Dacey 
1984 Daniel A. Hanson 
1985 David Fallis 
1986 Laurence Ewashko 
1990 Andrew Slonetsky 
1992 William Brown 
1994 Oksana Rodak 
1996 Peter Nikiforuk 
1998 Stephanie Martin, Pax Christi Chorale and Lynn Janes 
2000 Bevan Keating (Mark Vuorinen received honourable mention)
2002 Teri Dunn, Jennifer Moir 
2004 Postponed while OAC undertook a review of the selection and adjudication process 
2006 Zimfira Poloz, Linda Beaupré (Isabel Bernaus and Marie-Claire Gervasoni received honourable mention)
2008 Ken Fleet 
2010 Dr. Sarah Morrison
2012 Dr. Jamie Hillman (University of Toronto) 
2014 Dr. Rachel Rensink-Hoff (Brock University)
2016 Mark Vuorinen (Waterloo University)
2018 Charlene Pauls

References

External links 
Ontarion Arts Council- Leslie Bell Prize for Choral Conducting
Choirs Ontario- Leslie Bell Prize for Choral Conducting

Awards established in 1973
Canadian music awards
Conducting competitions